Madonna della Strada is a chapel on the campus of Loyola University Chicago in the neighborhood of Rogers Park, Chicago: it is named after the mother church of the Jesuit Province of Chicago (one of the largest Jesuit provinces).

History
The Chapel was the dream of Father James Mertz, S.J., who raised the money for its construction. The Madonna Della Strada Chapel is the main chapel on the Lake Shore Campus of Loyola University Chicago. The chapel was built on the lakefront with the waters of Lake Michigan directly at its front doorstep.  The church was designed and built at a time when it was anticipated that Lake Shore Drive would be extended and pass directly in front, but that project was abandoned. The chapel was designed by architect Andrew Rebori in the Art Deco Style and opened its doors to the Loyola University Chicago Community in 1938. Because of scant record keeping, it is not certain which of the several artists and designers were responsible for each of the artworks and decorations at the Chapel, but Chicago's Edgar Miller did figure prominently in the process and execution of many of the works.

Several chapel churches in Latin America were named after the chapel church in Chicago, as a tribute to Loyola University Chicago Jesuit and student missionaries.

Stained glass windows
The seven stained glass windows on the north side of the nave represents the seven colleges that existed when the Chapel was built.
 St. Thomas Aquinas - Arts & sciences
 St. Luke - Medicine
 St. Anne and Mary - Nursing
 St. Thomas More - Law
 St. Matthew - Business administration
 St. Vincent de Paul - Social Work
 St. Apollonia of Alexandria - Dentistry

The seven stained glass windows on the south side of the nave illustrate the principal ministries of the Jesuits.
 St. Peter Canisius - Education
 St. Francis Regis - Spiritual Life
 St. Francis Xavier - Foreign Missions
 St. Ignatius - The Spiritual Exercises
 St. Joseph - Ministry to the Dying
 The Blessed Virgin - Sodality of Our Lady
 The Sacred Heart

Renovations
Renovation of Madonna della Strada began in July 2006 and concluded in August 2007. A cooling system and mechanical ventilation system were installed.

Katheryn "Kay" Stamm Memorial Organ
A new pipe organ by Goulding and Wood was built and installed in 2008. The Katheryn "Kay" Stamm Memorial Organ has 70 ranks distributed over three manuals and pedal and played via a terraced console located in the rear gallery.

The chapel hosts an annual "Midnight Organ Blast" at midnight on Halloween, featuring eerie melodies.

The Loyola University Department of Sacramental Life hosts a series of free organ concerts on the third Sunday of each month.

See also
Madonna Della Strada

References

External links

Madonna Della Strada Chapel at Loyola University Chicago
Stained glass windows, North wall
Stained glass windows, South wall

Art Deco architecture in Illinois
Roman Catholic churches in Chicago
Loyola University Chicago
Chicago Landmarks
University and college chapels in the United States
Roman Catholic churches completed in 1938
Roman Catholic chapels in the United States
20th-century Roman Catholic church buildings in the United States